Ronald Lightbown (1932–2021) was a noted British art historian and curator, specializing in Renaissance art. He wrote large monographs on the painters Sandro Botticelli and Carlo Crivelli. After a degree from the University of Cambridge, between 1958 and his retirement in 1989 he worked at the Victoria and Albert Museum in London, rising to be the Keeper of its library and then as Keeper of Metalwork.

Selected publications
 Lightbown, R. W. (2004). Carlo Crivelli. Yale University Press.
 Lightbown, R. W. (1978). Sandro Botticelli. 2 vols. Berkeley: University of California Press

References

1932 births
2021 deaths
People associated with the Victoria and Albert Museum
British art historians
British curators